Kevin Schlitte (born 4 November 1981) is a German former professional footballer who played as a midfielder and is actually the coach of Haldensleber SC.

Career 
Schlitte was born in Haldensleben, Saxony-Anhalt.

He joined SC Freiburg from Carl Zeiss Jena in 2007. After two years, he went back to East Germany to sign with Hansa Rostock. After Rostock had been relegated, he signed for Erzgebirge Aue on 28 May 2010.

External links
Profile at Kicker.de

1981 births
Living people
Association football midfielders
German footballers
FC Carl Zeiss Jena players
SC Freiburg players
FC Hansa Rostock players
FC Erzgebirge Aue players
2. Bundesliga players